Montecastello is a frazione of the comune of Pontedera, in the province of Pisa, Tuscany, Italy.  According to ISTAT, the population is 269.

References
ISTAT

Frazioni of the Province of Pisa